Yangazino (Yañğaźı) is a rural locality (a village) in Ishmukhametovsky Selsoviet, Baymaksky District, Bashkortostan, Russia. The population was 130 as of 2010. There are 3 streets.

Geography 
Yangazino is located 43 km southeast of Baymak (the district's administrative centre) by road. Ishmukhametovo is the nearest rural locality.

References 

Rural localities in Baymaksky District